William T. "Big Bill" Smith (1869 – ?) was a Negro leagues catcher and manager for several years before the founding of the first Negro National League. He played for several teams, most of the seasons appear to be played for the Chicago Unions, Brooklyn Royal Giants and Cuban Giants.

Smith attended Fisk University in Nashville, Tennessee. He started with Frank Leland and the Chicago Unions at the age of 20, working with the team until 1897.

In his 30s, Smith played for the Cuban X-Giants for a couple seasons, moved on to the Brooklyn Royal Giants in 1905, then half a dozen other teams.

He was still playing baseball for the Schenectady Mohawk Giants and the Brooklyn All Stars at the age of 45 years.

References

External links

Negro league baseball managers
Cuban X-Giants players
Philadelphia Giants players
Brooklyn Royal Giants players
Illinois Giants players
Schenectady Mohawk Giants players
Baseball players from Tennessee
1869 births
Year of death unknown